Lower Louviers and Chicken Alley, also known as Louviers and Duck Street, is a historic home located near Wilmington in New Castle County, Delaware. It was added to the National Register of Historic Places in 1972.

History
The house was built in 1811 and is a two-story to three-story, five bay, stuccoed stone dwelling. The three center bays project slightly from the main body of the home. In 1935, a kitchen wing was added to the other end of the residence, plus a gated wall and garage.

The home was owned by members of the prominent Du Pont family. At the back of the house is "Chicken Alley", an excellent example of a 19th-century workers' row house.

See also
Louviers (Wilmington, Delaware)

References

Du Pont family residences
Houses on the National Register of Historic Places in Delaware
Houses completed in 1811
Houses in Wilmington, Delaware
National Register of Historic Places in Wilmington, Delaware